John Leubrie Hill (died August 1916) was a composer and writer. He wrote songs and musicals.

He was in Rufus Rastus (1906), Mr. Lode of Koal (1909) and Bandanna Land (1908).

He wrote the musical Hello Paris with J. Rosamond Johnson.  He also wrote the musical My Friend from Dixie. He formed the Colored Vaudeville Exchange and in 1913 he produced and starred in My Friend from Kentucky at the Lafayette Theatre in Harlem. It was an influential hit with vibrant dance numbers that launched a trend of New York City theater patrons heading uptown for shows. Florenz Ziegfeld who produced of the Ziegfeld Follies purchased the rights for some of the show's songs including "At the Ball, That's All". Parts of the show were also used in Darktown Follies, debuting in 1914. 

His song "At the Ball, That's All" was recorded by various artists on several record labels.

The New York Public Library has an image of him with "his Darktown Follies".

Discography
"Rock me in the cradle of love", from Ziegfeld follies (1914)

"Eddie Leonard's Molasses candy" (1910) 

"Daffy-down-dilly : characteristic march two-step" (1907)

"At the ball that's all"

Filmography
Lime Kiln Field Day (1913)

References

1916 deaths